is a 2003 Japanese film directed by Taiwanese director Hou Hsiao-hsien for Shochiku as homage to Yasujirō Ozu, with direct reference to the late director's Tokyo Story (1953). It premiered at a festival commemorating the centenary of Ozu's birth. It was nominated for a Golden Lion at the 2004 Venice Film Festival.

Plot

The story revolves around Yoko Inoue (played by Yo Hitoto), a young Japanese woman doing research on Taiwanese composer Jiang Wen-Ye, whose work is featured on the soundtrack. The late composer's Japanese wife and daughter also make appearances as themselves.

Cast
 Yo Hitoto - Yoko Inoue (井上 陽子 Inoue Yōko)
 Tadanobu Asano - Hajime Takeuchi (竹内 肇 Takeuchi Hajime)
 Masato Hagiwara - Seiji
 Kimiko Yo - Yoko's stepmother
 Nenji Kobayashi - Yoko's father

Reception
Café Lumière was placed at 98 on Slant Magazine's best films of the 2000s.

In 2019, director Steve McQueen named it as the best film of the 21st century, describing it as "[a] film that happens without you knowing."

Notes

External links
 

2003 films
Taiwanese drama films
2000s Japanese-language films
Films directed by Hou Hsiao-hsien
Shochiku films
Films with screenplays by Chu T’ien-wen
2000s Japanese films
Japanese drama films